Torsten Schmitz (born 26 August 1964 in Crivitz) is a retired German boxer in the Light Middleweight class.  He represented East Germany at the 1988 Summer Olympics.

Amateur career 
Schmitz was an amateur standout and fought in several notable European tournaments, compiling a record of 215–35.

Amateur highlights 
1982 Junior European Champion at Welterweight in Schwerin, Germany
Defeated Luciano Bruno (Italy) in the final.
1984 1st place at the Friendship Games in Havana, Cuba as a Welterweight
Defeated Khaidavyn Gantulga (Mongolia) RSCI 3
Defeated Luis Garcia (Venezuela) PTS (5-0)
Defeated Jose Luis Hernandez (Cuba) PTS (4-1)
1985 competed at the European Championships in Budapest, Hungary as a Welterweight
Defeated Jacek Olejniczak (Poland) PTS (4-1)
Lost to Borislav Abadzhiev (Bulgaria) PTS (2-3)
1986 3rd place at World Championships in Reno, United States as a Welterweight
Defeated Stefan Driscu (Romania) PTS (4-1)
Defeated Kim Dong-Kil (South Korea) PTS (5-0)
Defeated Israel Akopkokhyan (Soviet Union) PTS (3-2)
Lost to Candelario Duvergel (Cuba) PTS (2-3)
1988 competed at the Seoul Olympics as a Light Middleweight
Defeated Angel Stoyanov (Bulgaria) PTS (3-2)
Lost to Park Si-hun (South Korea) PTS (0-5)
1989 2nd place as a Light Middleweight at the World Championships in Moscow, USSR
Defeated Fikret Kaman (Turkey) PTS (13-9)
Defeated Laszlo Gal (Hungary) PTS (18-9)
Defeated Erik Bredler (Sweden) PTS (14-6)
Defeated Kabary Salem (Egypt) PTS (15-2)
Lost to Israel Akopkokhyan (Soviet Union) PTS (8-19)
1990 2nd place at the Goodwill Games in Seattle, USA
Defeated Chris Byrd (USA) PTS (3-2)
Defeated Alexander Lebziak (Soviet Union) PTS (4-1)
Lost to Israel Akopkokhyan (Soviet Union) PTS (2-3)
1991 3rd place as a Light Middleweight at World Championships in Sydney, Australia
Defeated Orhan Delibaş (Netherlands) PTS (18-14)
Defeated Jan Dydak (Poland) PTS (20-12)
Defeated Stefan Driscu (Romania) PTS (17-7)
Lost to Juan Carlos Lemus (Cuba) RSC-2
1991 2nd place at European Championships in Gothenborg, Sweden
Lost the final to Israel Akopkokhyan (Soviet Union)

Trainer 
Since 1996 Schmitz is working as coach for Universum Box-Promotion. Trained/Trains Regina Halmich, Bert Schenk, Armand Krajnc, Luan Krasniqi, Michael Trabant, and Alesia Graf.

References 

profil on Boxing.de
sports-reference

1964 births
Living people
People from Crivitz
People from Bezirk Schwerin
German male boxers
Sportspeople from Mecklenburg-Western Pomerania
Light-middleweight boxers
Olympic boxers of East Germany
Boxers at the 1988 Summer Olympics
AIBA World Boxing Championships medalists
Recipients of the Patriotic Order of Merit in gold
Competitors at the 1990 Goodwill Games